Unasyn is the trade name for two related antibiotic drugs:
 Ampicillin/sulbactam, a fixed-dose combination medication of the penicillin antibiotic combination ampicillin/sulbactam
 Sultamicillin, an oral form of the penicillin antibiotic combination ampicillin/sulbactam